The 1993 Overseas Final was the thirteenth running of the Overseas Final as part of the qualification for the 1993 Speedway World Championship Final to be held in Pocking, Germany. The 1993 Final was held at the Brandon Stadium in Coventry, England on 13 June and was the second last qualifying round for Commonwealth and American riders. ultimate individual prize.

1993 Overseas Final
13 June
 Coventry, Brandon Stadium
Qualification: Top 9 plus 1 reserve to the World Semi-final

References

See also
 Motorcycle Speedway

1993
World Individual